Whitley Bay is a seaside town in the North Tyneside borough in Tyne and Wear, England. It formerly governed as part of Northumberland and has been part of Tyne and Wear since 1974. Two notable landmarks are the Spanish City (a domed building on the seafront) and St. Mary's Lighthouse, the latter on a small island near the town.

History

Early history 
Whitley was first mentioned around 1100 when King Henry I conferred it with other possessions on the Priory of Tynemouth being referred to in ancient documents and maps before that date as Witelei, Wyteley, Hwyteleg, Witelithe, Wheteley, Wytheleye, Whitlaw, Whitlathe and Whitlag. Whitley is also referred to in the charters of King Henry II, King Richard I and King John, confirming to the priors their possessions and liberties.

Whitley was connected with the Crusades when Pope Nicholas IV granted to Edward I the first-fruits and tenths of all ecclesiastical possessions for six years to defray the expenses of an expedition to the Holy Land. A valuation was made of the spiritual and temporal goods of the Priory on 26 March 1292, when the yearly rents from Whitley were returned as 20 shillings, and the tithes as 9 marks.

About the beginning of the 14th century, the manor of Whitley was held from the Prior of Tynemouth by a singular feudal service called the Conveyes which seems to have originated from John de Whitley.  Richard de Emeldon, eighteen times Mayor of Newcastle and seven times its representative in Parliament, was the Lord of the Manor of Whitley in 1333.

On 9 April 1345, Edward III granted Gilbert de Whitley a licence to crenellate his manor house at Whitley. To crenellate a house was to place battlements on it. Before this could be done, the sanction of the Crown was often sought. Although battlements were often largely symbolic, in this instance it is probably an indication of the degree of insecurity felt even this far south during the Edwardian wars with Scotland. The licence and crenellations were an indication of status. Only 2% of the small tower houses of the sort Gilbert built had licences. The 'sanction' of the crown was a sought-after bonus, but not a requirement.

After the Dissolution of the Monasteries, Whitley was held under the Crown for a time. By a grant of Edward VI dated 8 December 1551, it came into the hands of Dudley, Earl of Warwick who was created Duke of Northumberland. It remained in the Percy family until 1632 after which time the area appeared to be let at a yearly rental to various holders until it came into the possession of the Duke of Somerset on his marriage in 1682 with Elizabeth, the heiress of Joscelyn, the 11th Earl of Northumberland. Whitley subsequently passed by inheritance to her granddaughter Elizabeth Seymour who had married Sir Hugh Smithson, a Yorkshire baronet, afterwards created Duke of Northumberland. Whitley has since been retained by descendants and the present Duke of Northumberland is the Lord of the Manor and principal landowner.

Monkseaton, which forms the greater part of the north west of the district, is also very old and its industries were common with those of Whitley being chiefly coalmining and limestone quarrying.

19th century to present

From the late 19th century and into the 20th century, the adverse effects of the decline of local coal mining and dependent industries in the area were ameliorated by the emergence of Whitley as a seaside holiday resort. The opening of the North Tyne Loop railway line in 1882, connecting the coastal villages to Newcastle, benefited the tourism industry. The line, now followed by the present Metro system, included a new railway station in the centre of the town, and another at Monkseaton. Both stations remain in use as Metro stations. Whitley Bay remains a popular holiday resort, with a caravan park operated by Parkdean Resorts for both holidaymakers and holiday home owners.

The parish church is St. Paul's Church. It was provided by the Duke of Northumberland when the parish of Tynemouth was divided in 1860 and it was consecrated in 1864.

The Whitley and Monkseaton Local Board was established in 1873. The district of the Local Board became the Urban District of Whitley and Monkseaton.

The town was known as Whitley until the 1890s, by which time confusion with Whitby, in North Yorkshire, regularly caused mail to be misdirected. The final straw came in September 1901 when a former resident died in Edinburgh and his body was to be buried in St Paul's churchyard, Whitley. Unfortunately, the body was  mistakenly transported to Whitby, thereby delaying the funeral. When the council asked residents for suggestions of a new name, the most popular choice was Whitley Bay. Though since known officially as Whitley Bay, many residents still refer to the town as 'Whitley'.

On 1 January 1944, the Whitley and Monkseaton Urban District became the Whitley Bay Urban District and on 5 March 1954 it was granted a Royal Charter of Incorporation as the Borough of Whitley Bay. The charter was presented by The Princess Royal at a ceremony in the town on 14 April 1954.

The Local Government Act 1972 abolished the borough, with Hartley in the north of the borough becoming a part of Blyth Valley district in Northumberland, and the majority of the town including Whitley Bay and Monkseaton forming part of the Metropolitan Borough of North Tyneside in the Tyne and Wear area. The town is in the constituency of Tynemouth.

Geography 

Whitley Bay is around 10 miles east of Newcastle upon Tyne. It is bounded by the coastline of the North Sea to the east. Tynemouth is 3 miles south.

St Mary's Island, a tidal island at the northern tip of the town, is the site of a lighthouse, one of the town's landmarks. Coal seams are exposed in the cliffs next to the beach just North of St Mary's Island and it is possible to pick up coal from the beach at low tide. The coal seams in the cliffs extend all the way to Seaton Sluice.

Transport 

A Metro journey to Newcastle city centre takes around 25 minutes, via South Gosforth or Wallsend.

The main bus operators in the town are Go North East and Arriva Northumbria. Until the late 1990s, Arriva owned and operated a bus station and depot in the town. This closed in 1998, and the Park View Shopping centre sits on the site of both this, and the old Post office building.

Media 
The local weekly newspaper, The News Guardian, is published by Johnston Press and printed on the presses of the Sunderland Echo in nearby Sunderland. The alternative free weekly paper is the Chronicle Extra, formerly known as the Herald and Post.

Education 
There are two high schools in the town, Whitley Bay High School and Monkseaton High School. The town is one of the few remaining in the UK that operates on a three-tier system, with first, middle and high schools.

Regeneration

On 20 February 2007, North Tyneside Council announced plans to regenerate the Spanish City and Whitley Bay. At the core of the plan was the redevelopment of the Spanish City site with its iconic dome, completed in 1912. For many years it was home to a theme park with rides and attractions, until falling into decay following the closure of the theme park in 2000. The Spanish City was reopened in July 2018.

Recent civic improvements include, a skatepark opened in the Panama Dip in 2008, a children's play park on Whitley Park in 2007, refurbishment of the swimming pool and the Playhouse both re-opened in 2009. A new library (behind the main street in the town centre) with a tourist information office, and joint service centre on the site of York Road was completed in 2013.

Sport

Football

Whitley Bay F.C. play at the town's Hillheads Park, adjacent to the ice rink. The Hillheads stadium in the west of the town and holds approximately 4,500 spectators with 250 seats in the main stand. Now playing in the Northern League Division One, the club won the FA Vase (amateur FA Cup) in 2002, beating Tiptree United at Villa Park, Birmingham.

Whitley Bay reached the FA Vase final again in May 2009, when the club beat Glossop North End 2–0 at the new Wembley Stadium. They retained the trophy the following year by beating Wroxham 6–1 at Wembley in the final of the 2009–10 FA Vase. In May 2011 they made it an unprecedented three in a row, and four wins in total this time beating Coalville Town 3–2.

Ice Hockey
Whitley Bay Ice Rink is home of Whitley Warriors Ice Hockey Club. The team enjoyed success together with local rivals Durham Wasps at a national level during the 1980s and early 1990s.

Rugby union
Whitley Bay Rockcliff RFC play at the Lovaine Avenue ground in Hillheads. Founded in 1887 as Rockcliff RFC, and still generally known as "Rockcliff", they were originally based on the seafront in the Rockcliff area of the town, prior to moving along the seafront to the site later occupied by the Spanish City. In 1907 they moved to the present site in Lovaine Avenue. The years immediately after formation and up to the First World War were the most successful in the club's history, when they were one of the strongest sides in England, beating the world-famous Barbarians in 1892, and producing a number of international players including E.W "Little Billy" Taylor, who captained England in the 1890s. The introduction of the league structures in the late 1980s saw the club climb into the north east leagues in the early 1990s. The club now plays in the Durham and Northumberland Division 2.

Speedway
The Rockcliff ground was the home of the short-lived Dirt Track or Speedway venture in the spring of 1929. The first venue on Tyneside, it was not as popular as the sister track at Gosforth Stadium which opened early summer and was closed after only two months, when the operator Tyneside Speedways Ltd went into liquidation.

Religion 

There are a number of Christian denominations and mosques in the town:
Baptist church
Whitley Bay
Whitley Lodge
Roman Catholic church (Diocese of Hexham and Newcastle)
St Edward's
St Mary's
Church of England (Diocese of Newcastle)
 St Alban's, Earsdon
 St Mary's, Monkseaton
 St Paul's
 St Peter's, Monkseaton
Free Church
The Bay
Acorn Community
Methodist church
St John's
United Reformed Church
St Andrew's, Monkseaton
Mosques
Whitley Bay Islamic Cultural Centre
North Tyneside Bangladeshi Community Association.

Notable people

Gladstone Adams – inventor of the windscreen wiper and former mayor
Kate Adie - News reporter & Chief News Correspondent, BBC News (1989 - 2003). Presenter, From Our Own Correspondent, BBC Radio 4. Born in Whitley Bay.
David Gilford Armstrong - eminent animal nutritionist - born and raised here
Michael Bridges – former Newcastle United and Sunderland football player
Ann Cleeves – author
Denis Coe – politician
John Coxon – footballer
L Devine - Singer-songwriter
Sam Fender - Singer/Songwriter, former pupil of Whitley Bay High School Sixth Form
Graham Fenton – footballer
Toby Flood – England rugby union international
John Gilroy – artist of Guinness advertisement fame
Tom Hadaway – playwright
W. E. Johns – author of Biggles (c. 1925)
Ian La Frenais – comedy writer (The Likely Lads, Porridge, Auf Wiedersehen, Pet)
Graham Laws – Football League referee
Will Lenney – YouTuber
John Middleton – actor (Emmerdale)
 Tim Palmer - Record Producer 
Peter Ramage – Queens Park Rangers and former Newcastle United player – former pupil of Whitley Bay High School
Andrea Riseborough – actor
Laura Spence – Whitley Bay state school student rejected by Oxford University who later attended Harvard University in the USA 
Steven Taylor – footballer
Steve Tupling – former footballer
Stephen Tompkinson - actor, lives in Whitley Bay
Hilton Valentine – guitarist, The Animals
Shirley Webb – athlete
Emily Hilda Young – novelist

In popular culture

Television 
In the 1960s, the BBC television series Come Dancing included regional finals broadcast from the Empress Ballroom, Whitley Bay.

Whitley Bay was also featured in the 1980s children's television series Supergran.

Scenes in the early 1990s BBC detective series Spender were filmed in the town and one episode was primarily set at the Whitley Bay Ice Rink. The 2006 BBC sitcom Thin Ice was also filmed in the town and at the ice rink.

Several episodes of ITV's Vera were filmed in the town, including The Rendezvous Cafe and the sea front.

Over the years, scenes from the children's TV series Byker Grove were filmed in the town.

Film 

Parts of the 1976 film The Likely Lads were filmed in the town.

The 2000 film Purely Belter included scenes filmed at the bingo hall adjacent to the Spanish City Dome. Some of the external shots show what remained of the theme park at that time. The town also features in 2013 film The Cullercoats Fishlass, produced by local company ACT 2 CAM, in which Charles Elderton tries to persuade the Spanish City owners to let his troupe perform there, despite the Sunday licensing laws.

Whitley Bay Film Festival 2010–present. A community annual event. Patron Ian La Frenais.

Radio 
The Whitley Bay Municipal Orchestra, conducted by Percival Goffin, was regularly broadcast on radio by the BBC in the 1930s, from the Winter Gardens, Whitley Bay. In 1968, BBC Radio 4's Morning Service, was broadcast from St Paul's Church. In 1992, the Radio 1 Roadshow was broadcast from The Links in the town and in 2001, the Radio 1 Dance Party also came from The Links.

Music 
The video for Tina Cousins's single "Pray" was filmed at St Mary's Lighthouse, the Spanish City, along the sea front and in an alley behind Whitley Bay Baptist Church. The Spanish City is also referenced in the Dire Straits song "Tunnel of Love". Journey South recorded scenes for the video of their single "The First Time Ever I Saw Your Face" on the seafront and at the Rendezvous Cafe.

The rock band Tygers of Pan Tang formed in Whitley Bay in 1978.

Literature 
Whitley Bay is the main location for Ann Cleeves' crime novel The Seagull.

See also
 Bands and musicians from Yorkshire and North East England

References 

 
Seaside resorts in England
Towns in Tyne and Wear
Populated coastal places in Tyne and Wear
Unparished areas in Tyne and Wear
Metropolitan Borough of North Tyneside